Allogromia terricola is a species of unicellular foraminiferan in the genus Allogromia.

References 

Monothalamea
Species described in 1874